The vaporetto is a Venetian public waterbus. There are 19 scheduled lines that serve locales within Venice, and travel between Venice and nearby islands, such as Murano, Burano, and Lido.

The name, vaporetto, could be translated as "little steamer", and refers to similarly purposed ships in the past that were run by steam. The natives call the vaporetto batèlo or vaporino. The waterbus line is operated by Azienda del Consorzio Trasporti Veneziano (Actv), the Venetian public transport system. The vaporetto is necessary in Venice as deep canals prohibit building underground railways, and there is no space for overground trains, leaving the canals as the only viable rapid transport system. Most vaporetti have disability access.

It has twenty-four-hour scheduled service, with frequency varying by the line.  Line 1 serves the Grand Canal. Several lines are limited to the summer season, April to October.

ACTV sells 12-, 24-, 36-, 48- and 72-hour passes as well as single-journey tickets and 7-day passes. The private express company Alilaguna also operates a limited water bus service, to the airport for example, although its boats (including a new one that is a hybrid electric/diesel) are not technically considered to be vaporetti.

The first vaporetto appeared in 1881, in competition with gondoliers and hotel boatmen. The subsequent debate that the first few vaporettos caused helped shaped their role as "Venetian buses", as well as helping the gondoliers, as the only ones with access into the smaller waterways, continue into the present day.

Routes 
Vaporetto No. 1 is considered the main tourist route in Venice, since its main part passes along the Grand Canal. Boats starts from Piazzale Roma and ends its way on the island of Lido.

Route No. 1 stops at each stop along the way. Therefore, it takes up to 45 minutes to cover the distance from Santa Lucia Station to Piazza San Marco.

Note that the vaporetto on this route does not stop at island of San Giorgio Maggiore. Despite the fact that the basilica located there is one of the main attractions of Venice.

Vaporetto route 2 is much faster and therefore more convenient. Boats can move both from P.le Roma along the Grand Canal to San Marco and along the Giudecca Canal.

In the first case, the boat does not stop at Salute, near the famous church of Santa Maria della Salute. And also at island of San Giorgio Maggiore - in contrast to the number 2 vaporetto coming trough the Giudecca Canal.

Vaporetto number 3 is the only route that directly links P.le Roma with the island of Murano. You can get to Burano, Mazzorbo, and Torcello by vaporetto No. 12.

You can also get to Murano with the help of (indirect) vaporetto No. 4.1, 4.2.

Notes

See also 
Actv
Piers in Venice

External links
Main website for the Vaporetto
Ticket offices for the Vaporetto
Illustrated introduction and how-go guide for visitors
Description of fares
Description of lines' routes
Main tourist lines, tariffs, discounts

Public transport in Italy
Water taxis
Water transport in Venice